Teva Pharmaceuticals USA, Inc. v. Sandoz, Inc., 574 U.S. 318 (2015), is a landmark patent Supreme Court case disputing over the Copaxone patent. The Court held that, when reviewing a district court’s resolution of subsidiary factual matters made in the course of its construction of a patent claim, the Federal Circuit must apply a "clear error," not a de novo, standard of review.

Facts and procedural history
The case originated in the Southern District of New York, where Sandoz sued to invalidate Teva's patent on a drug for the treatment of multiple sclerosis.  In the Markman hearing, Sandoz argued that a claim was fatally indefinite for failing to identify which of three possible meanings a particular claim term, related to the molecular weight of a component of the drug, should be interpreted to have.  The district court judge held that the claim term was definite, and that a "person of ordinary skill in the art" would interpret the term "molecular weight" to mean the "peak average molecular weight", that is, the weight of the molecule most prevalent in the mixture.  In doing so, the judge relied in part on expert witness testimony.

Sandoz appealed to the Federal Circuit, which reviewed the claim under a 'de novo' standard, decided that the claim term was fatally indefinite, and hence that the patent was invalid.

Teva appealed to the US Supreme Court and won.

References

External links
 

Multiple sclerosis
United States patent case law
United States Supreme Court cases
United States Supreme Court cases of the Roberts Court
2015 in United States case law